All You Need is Pag-ibig is a 2015 Filipino Family romantic comedy film directed by Antoinette Jadaone and released by Star Cinema and Viva Films. As their official entry to 2015 Metro Manila Film Festival. It stars an ensemble cast including Kris Aquino, Bimby Aquino Yap, Derek Ramsay, Kim Chiu, Xian Lim, Ronaldo Valdez, Nova Villa, Pokwang, Jodi Sta. Maria and Ian Veneracion.

The film was controversial due to several changes in the story and casting, much to the disappointment of fans. The film was a flop and was pulled out in most theaters days after its release, earning only PhP37 million and finished 5th out of 8 in the MMFF race.

Cast

 Kris Aquino as Love
 Derek Ramsay as Dom
 Kim Chiu as Anya del Rosario
 Xian Lim as Dino
 Jodi Sta. Maria as Mel
 Ian Veneracion as Eric del Rosario
 Ronaldo Valdez as Jaime
 Pokwang as Corina
 Nova Villa as Loisa
 Bimby Aquino Yap as Jake Rodrigo
 Julia Concio as Hannah
 Talia Concio as Kelsey
 Neri Naig as Ellen
 Maricar Reyes as Sandra
 Agot Isidro as Jessica
 Allen Dizon as Alex
 Candy Pangilinan as Grace/Mel's Eldest Sister
 Shy Carlos as Tara
 Karen Dematera as Dianne
 Trina Legaspi
Eslove Briones
 John Bermudo
 Via Antonio
 Ruby Ruiz

Production

Pre-production
The film undergone a lot of complicated situations, it was first announced in June 2015 with its original working title, Mr. & Mrs. Split that is
to be starred by Kris Aquino, Bimby Aquino Yap and Herbert Bautista until in September 2015 it was changed again into Pamilyang Lab Luv Love until weeks after, the production team already confirmed it as All You Need Is Pag-Ibig which adds Kim Chiu and Xian Lim with the cast. In early October 2015, reports were said that the movie will not push through with Aquino citing personal and health reasons. Reports also said that the movie will push through but this time Bautista will not be part of the film. Rumours then spread that phenomenal loveteam Jodi Sta. Maria and Richard Yap would instead lead the movie, marking their big onscreen reunion which delighted their fans here and abroad. However, in late October 2015, drastic changes were made due to Aquino's decision to do the movie. It was announced that Herbert Bautista will be replaced by Derek Ramsay, with additional casts Julia and Talia Concio.

Casting 
The film was announced in June 2015 as one of two entries of Star Cinema in the annual Metro Manila Film Festival together with its cast members Kris Aquino, Herbert Bautista, Bimby Aquino Yap and Jana Agoncillo. However the film undergo complication with its cast members Aquino and Bautista leading the film to be shelved. In October 23, the final casting was announced. Kris Aquino and Bimby Aquino Yap remain in the film while Herbert Bautista was replaced by Derek Ramsay and Jana Agoncillo was replaced by Talia Concio. In addition,  Kim Chiu, Xian Lim, Jodi Sta Maria and Ian Veneracion completes the final cast members.

Release
All You Need Is Pag-Ibig was released in Philippine theaters on December 25, 2015, as an official entry to the 2015 Metro Manila Film Festival. It ranked only 5th in the MMFF race out of the 8 movies and was pulled out in most theaters only a few days after its release.

Awards

References

External links
 

Star Cinema films
2015 films
Philippine romantic comedy films
2015 romantic comedy films
2010s Tagalog-language films
Films directed by Antoinette Jadaone
2010s English-language films